International development aid is given by many non-private donors. The first table is based on official development assistance (ODA) figures published by the OECD for members of its Development Assistance Committee (DAC). Non-DAC members included in the OECD's publishing are listed separately.

Luxembourg made the largest contribution as a percentage of gross national income (GNI) at 1.05% and the United Nations’ ODA target of 0.7% of GNI was also exceeded by Norway (1.02%), Sweden (0.99%) and Denmark (0.71%). The European Union accumulated a higher portion of GDP as a form of foreign aid than any other economic union.   

The United States is a small contributor relative to GNI (0.18% 2016) but is the largest single DAC donor of ODA in 2019 (US$34.6 billion), followed by Germany (0.6% GNI, US$23.8 billion), the United Kingdom (0.7%, US$19.4 billion), Japan (0.2%, US$15.5 billion) and France (0.4%, US$12.2 billion). Many providers beyond the DAC have long traditions of development cooperation. Amongst these, according to the preliminary figures for 2019 reported to the OECD, Turkey exceeded the 0.7% ODA/GNI target with 1.15%.

Net official development assistance by donor
To qualify as official development assistance, a contribution must contain three elements:
Be undertaken by the official sector (that is, a government or government agency);
With promotion of economic development and welfare as the main objective;
At concessional financial terms (that is, with favorable loan terms.)

Thus, by definition, ODA does not include private donations. 

The sum of contributions by EU member states, considered separately from EU institutions, was $73.80 billion.

The OECD's Development Assistance Committee members' total budget reached 152.8 billion dollars and was contributed by the following donors in 2019:

Development Assistance by DAC Members

Development Assistance by Non-DAC members
Non-DAC members reported the following figures:

See also
 List of countries by Official Development Assistance received

References

Bibliography

External links
 
 
 
 
 

Lists of countries by economic indicator
Contributions to foreign aid by country
Aid

Lists of countries by population-related issue